Dig That Treasure is the debut album by the band Cryptacize, released in 2008. It was released on Asthmatic Kitty. The title of the album was borrowed from a musical written by Kip Cohen in 1958.

Track listing
 "Stop Watch" – 3:58
 "No Coins" – 2:55
 "Heaven Is Human" – 2:46
 "Water Witching Wishes" – 3:12
 "The Shape Above" – 2:25
 "Cosmic Sing-a-long" – 1:54
 "How Did the Actor Laugh?" – 2:13
 "Willpower" – 2:57
 "We'll Never Dream Again" – 3:20
 "Dig That Treasure" – 2:51
 "Say You Will" – 2:36

Personnel
 Michael Carreira - percussion
 Chris Cohen – vocals, guitar
 Nedelle Torrisi - vocals, autoharp, guitar, strings

References

2008 albums
Asthmatic Kitty albums
Cryptacize albums